Watsonia railway station is located on the Hurstbridge line in Victoria, Australia. It serves the north-eastern Melbourne suburb of Watsonia, and it opened on 23 June 1924.

History

Watsonia station opened on 23 June 1924, and was provisionally known as Collina during construction. Like the suburb itself, the station is named after Frank Watson, a local landowner who subdivided his property "Grace Park" into the "Grace Park Station Estate".

The current station dates back to 1977, when this section of the railway line was lowered to remove a number of level crossings. In 1979, the line between Macleod and Greensborough was duplicated.

During 1988-1989, the present Greensborough Highway overpass, located nearby in the Down direction of the station, was provided.

In December 2007, Watsonia was upgraded to a Premium Station.

Facilities, platforms and services

Watsonia is located in a deep cutting, between the Greensborough Highway and Watsonia Road. It has one island platform with two faces, with access to the platforms provided by a pedestrian overpass and a ramp. The station features a customer service window, a coffee shop, an enclosed waiting room and toilets.

It is serviced by Metro Trains' Hurstbridge line services.

Platform 1:
  all stations and limited express services to Flinders Street

Platform 2:
  all stations services to Greensborough, Eltham and Hurstbridge

Transport links

Dysons operates two routes via Watsonia station, under contract to Public Transport Victoria:
 : Eltham station – Glenroy station
 : Lalor – Northland Shopping Centre

References

External links
 Melway map at street-directory.com.au

Premium Melbourne railway stations
Railway stations in Melbourne
Railway stations in Australia opened in 1924
Railway stations in the City of Banyule